Griveaudia nigropuncta is a species of moth of the  family Callidulidae. It is found in Asia.

References

Callidulidae
Moths described in 1898